1957 college football season may refer to:

 1957 NCAA University Division football season
 1957 NCAA College Division football season
 1957 NAIA football season